Ivor Francis (October 26, 1918 – October 22, 1986) was a Canadian-American character actor and acting teacher. He is the father of television soap opera actress Genie Francis.

Life and career
Francis was born in Toronto and began his acting career on the radio in Canada. He served in the Royal Air Force in the Second World War and then moved to the United States, where he played the son, Joe, in the radio program Ma Perkins.

Francis made several appearances on Broadway, in such plays as The Devil's Advocate, Gideon and J.B..  He performed frequently on television, including appearances in I Dream Of Jeannie, The Odd Couple, Barney Miller (as 4 different characters), a psychologist on Happy Days, The Mary Tyler Moore Show, Hart to Hart, Benson , Hawaii Five-O,  Starsky & Hutch, Dark Shadows, Bright Promise, Room 222, Get Smart,  The Practice, Little House on the Prairie, The Six Million Dollar Man and General Hospital, which starred his daughter, Genie Francis. He appeared as Carson Brookhaven in the syndicated comedy series  Dusty's Trail for one season, 1973–74.

His film debut came in 1964 in The Devil Walks.  Francis also appeared in such films as I Love My Wife, The World's Greatest Athlete, Superdad, Pieces of Dreams, The Steagle, The Prisoner of Second Avenue, Busting, The House of the Dead and The North Avenue Irregulars.

Francis died in Sherman Oaks, Los Angeles, California on October 22, 1986 from an undisclosed illness, at age 67, four days short of his 68th birthday.

Filmography

References

External links
 movies.yahoo.com
 
 
 

1918 births
1986 deaths
People from Englewood, New Jersey
Male actors from Toronto
Canadian male television actors
Canadian male film actors
Canadian male stage actors
Canadian emigrants to the United States
Canadian male radio actors
20th-century Canadian male actors
Royal Air Force personnel of World War II